Beor ("a burning") is a name which appears in relation to a king ("Bela son of Beor") and a diviner ("Balaam son of Beor"). Because the two names vary only by a single letter (-m, often added to the ends of names), scholars have hypothesized that the two refer to the same person.

In the Bible 
In a list of kings of Edom, Genesis records that a "Bela son of Beor" was one of the kings of Edom who reigned "before there reigned any king over the children of Israel." Bela son of Beor is listed as the first of eight kings. The same information in Genesis is repeated in Chronicles.

"Balaam son of Beor" appears in a well-known story in Numbers, where he is asked to curse the Israelites but repeatedly blesses them instead. Later, he is killed for tempting the Israelites into sin. He is mentioned in passing in Deuteronomy, in a passage which repeats a synopsis of earlier biblical stories.

Beor may be the Ba'al of Mount Peor in the Heresy of Peor, and may have influenced the demon Belphegor (Ba'al Peor).

Jewish tradition 
Beor the father of Balaam is considered a prophet by Judaism. The Talmud says in Baba Bathra 15b, "Seven prophets prophesied to the heathen, namely, Balaam and his father, Job, Eliphaz the Temanite, Bildad the Shuhite, Zophar the Naamathite, and Elihu, the son of Barachel the Buzite." In the King James translation of 2 Peter 2:15, Beor is called Bosor (from the Greek  Βεὼρ).

Islamic tradition 
The Baghdadi historian Al-Masudi said in his book Meadows of Gold and Mines of Gems that Balaam ben Beor was in a village in the lands of Shem (Canaan), and he is the son of Baura (Beor) ben Sanur ben Waseem ben Moab ben Lot ben Haran (PUT), and his prays were answered, so his folks asked him to pray against Joshua ben Nun but he could not do it, so he advised some of the kings of the giants to show the pretty women and release them toward the camp of Joshua ben Nun, and so they did, and they (the Israelites) hurried up to the women and the plague spread among them and seventy thousand of them were dead.

References

Book of Genesis people
Prophets in Judaism
Year of death unknown
Year of birth unknown